Bahadurpally is a village located in Medchal district near Hyderabad, India.

Commercial area
There are numerous grocery stores and factory outlets in Bahadurpally. The IT Giant 'Tech Mahindra Training Center' is located here.

Education
Mahindra École Centrale is a private engineering institute in Tech Mahindra Campus located at Bahadurpally.

Transport
The buses run by TSRTC connect it to different parts of the city.

From Secunderabad, bus no 227 is available to Bahadurpally Village and Bahadurpally X Roads, where as no 272 and 230 are available till Bahadurpally X Roads.

References

Villages in Ranga Reddy district